Raghavendra is a 2003 Indian Telugu-language action film directed by Suresh Krishna and written by Posani Krishna Murali. It stars Prabhas, Anshu and Shweta Agarwal. The music was scored by Mani Sharma. It was also dubbed in Hindi as Sanyasi: The Warrior Saint (2008) and Malayalam as Sakthi in spite of being remade by Suresh himself in Hindi as Rocky: The Rebel. It was remade in Bangladeshi Bengali as  Lover Number One  starring Bappy Chowdhury and Pori Moni.

Plot

Raghava (Prabhas) is a hot-blooded, restless youth who cannot tolerate injustice that is being done in society. In the process, he picks up a fight with a local don named Ankineedu (Anandaraj). Ankineedu stabs Raghava's ladylove Shirisha (Anshu) to death. He also issues an ultimatum to Raghava's parents (Murali Mohan and Prabha) to leave the city in a few hours. The vexed parents ask Raghava to accompany them only if he agrees to listen to their words. Hopeless Raghava accepts to give up fighting and live like a Saint. They take Raghava to Mantralayam, a relatives' place, and make him become a devotee of Raghavendra Swamy. This entire episode comes as a flashback. Raghava has a pretty fiancé called Maha Lakshmi (Shweta Agarwal) in Mantralayam. He becomes a saint-like man and does not respond when some goons humiliate Maha Lakshmi and take off her clothes in public. Raghava's parents, who forcibly restricted his helping nature, ask him to get rid of his maala  and go back to society to serve people. Raghava goes like a wounded tiger and fights with Ankineedu's goons. In the end, Raghavendra kills Ankineedu to save people and avenge Sirisha's Death.

Cast

Prabhas as Raghavendra
Anshu as Shirisha
Shweta Agarwal as Maha Lakshmi
Anandaraj as Ankineedu
Murali Mohan as Raghava's father
Prabha as Raghava's mother
Brahmanandam as Shirisha's brother
Rami Reddy as DSP
Kota Srinivasa Rao as Prabhas uncle
Mohan Raj
Gundu Hanumantha Rao
Vizag Prasad
Raghu Babu
Rama Prabha
Ram Charan
Simran in item number

Soundtrack
This movie has six songs composed by Mani Sharma. The song Calcutta Pan Vesina was based on the song Aal Thotta Bhoopathi Nanada from the Tamil film Youth, composed by Sharma.  The song Nee Styele was based on the song May Madham from the Tamil film Shahjahan, composed by Sharma.

Reception 
Jeevi of Idlebrain.com opined that " 'Raghavendra' is definitely worth a look to see Prabhas's performance!" A critic from Full Hyderabad wrote that "Raghavendra is a classic case of taking the Lord's name in vain".

References

External links

2000s Telugu-language films
2003 films
Telugu films remade in other languages
Films directed by Suresh Krissna
Films scored by Mani Sharma
2000s masala films
Indian action films
Films with screenplays by Posani Krishna Murali
2003 action films